Marrion "Yong" Gopez (born October 24, 1992) is a Filipino television personality, dancer, singer, model and a former reality show contestant in the Philippines when he joined Pinoy Big Brother: Teen Clash of 2010.

Television

Career

PBB career

Yong's career started on April 10, 2010 when he got included in the Pinoy Big Brother: Teen Clash of 2010 housemates. He was given the title "Boy Bread Winner of Pampanga." He is the youngest of three siblings. He is a son of an unemployed man and a housewife, and enjoys living a simple life. Yong was evicted (19th place) on Day 36.

References

1992 births
Living people
21st-century Filipino male singers
People from Pampanga
Pinoy Big Brother contestants